Max Siegel (born December 31, 1964) is an American corporate CEO, president, entertainer executive, multicultural activist and attorney. He is the current Chief Executive Officer of USA Track & Field (USATF), the National Governing Body of Athletics in the United States. He is also the owner of Rev Racing, a development racing team in NASCAR for female and minority drivers.

Education 
Siegel attended the University of Notre Dame in Notre Dame, Indiana where he earned a Bachelor of Arts degree in psychology and a Juris Doctor from the University of Notre Dame Law School. Siegel also served adjunct professorships in Sports & Entertainment Law (Indiana University School of Law-Indianapolis) and Law of the Music Business (Seton Hall University, Newark, New Jersey).

Professional career 
Siegel became CEO of USA Track & Field on May 1, 2012. Changes to the bottom line have been coupled with new USATF programs, particularly in the youth and elite athlete spaces but inclusive of all USATF constituencies. The result is a new business model for the Olympic family's most historic NGB, with Siegel noted as the "marketing genius" leading USATF.

Siegel owns Max Siegel Inc. (“MSI”), a sports, marketing, entertainment, and media holding company. The divisions of Max Siegel Inc. include Revolution Racing, LLC (Rev Racing), a NASCAR-sanctioned and minority owned race team; and Image Dei Music group, an urban inspiration label joint venture with Universal Music Group.

Siegel became the highest-ranking African American executive in NASCAR when he became President of Global Operations at Dale Earnhardt Inc. (“DEI”).

Siegel is the owner of Rev Racing, a development program in the NASCAR ARCA Menards Series and Advance Auto Parts Touring Series that is actively involved in the Drive for Diversity program designed to increase minority and female involvement in auto racing. The team was founded in 2009 and has fielded cars for many minority drivers, notably Daniel Suarez, Darrell Wallace Jr. and Kyle Larson.

Siegel held dual titles at Sony BMG serving as both Senior Vice President of Zomba Label Group and President of Zomba Gospel.

Tommy Boy was an independent record label joint venture with the Warner Music Group. As President of Tommy Boy Gospel and Sr. Vice President of Tommy Boy Music Group, Siegel was fully responsible for the Gospel division.

Professional associations 
Siegel is a member of the American, National, Indiana, and New York Bar Associations, Black Entertainment and Sports Lawyers Association, National Academy of Recording Arts and Sciences, Sigma Pi Phi and Kappa Alpha Psi.

References 

 New CEO:U.S. track and field still chasing 30 medals
American Track Gets New Leader
Max Siegel Named CEO of USA Track & Field
Can Mighty Max save DEI?
Max Siegel-Revolution Racing-CHANGING LANES on BET
Max Siegel Rejoins Baker & Daniels' Sports & Entertainment Practice
Know What Makes Them Tick

Living people
American chief executives
University of Notre Dame alumni
1964 births